Corinne Peters (née Laliberte; born 1960) is a Canadian curler from Winnipeg, Manitoba. She is the twin sister of Connie Laliberte, with whom she played on the Canadian and World championship team of 1984. She also known as Corrine Webb and played as alternate for Laliberte at the 1993 Scott Tournament of Hearts.

Peters was inducted into the Manitoba Curling Hall of Fame in 2001.

References

External links

 Corine Webb – Curling Canada Stats Archive
Past Champions. Canadian Curling Association. Retrieved on 2008-03-29.

Living people
Canadian women curlers
Curlers from Manitoba
1960 births
Canadian women's curling champions
Twin sportspeople
Canadian twins